Gioia Dragomani (died 1630) was a Roman Catholic prelate who served as Bishop of Pienza (1599–1630)
and Bishop of Montepeloso (1592–1596).

On 27 November 1592, Dragomani was appointed during the papacy of Pope Clement VIII as Bishop of Montepeloso.
He resigned from the bishopric in 1596. 
On 15 December 1599, he was appointed during the papacy of Pope Clement VIII as Bishop of Pienza.
He served as Bishop of Pienza until his death on 26 December 1630.

References

External links and additional sources
 (Chronology of Bishops) 
 (Chronology of Bishops) 
 (for Chronology of Bishops) 
 (for Chronology of Bishops) 

16th-century Italian Roman Catholic bishops
17th-century Italian Roman Catholic bishops
Bishops appointed by Pope Clement VIII
1630 deaths
Bishops of Pienza